Trinidad and Tobago competed at the 2012 Summer Olympics in London, United Kingdom from 27 July to 12 August 2012. This was Trinidad and Tobago's most successful Summer Olympics. It was the nation's largest ever delegation sent to the Olympics, with a total of 30 athletes, 21 men and 9 women, in 6 sports. Trinidad and Tobago's participation in these games marked its sixteenth Olympic appearance as an independent nation, although it had previously competed in four other games (including the 1948 debut in the same host city London) as a British colony, and as part of the West Indies Federation. The nation was awarded four Olympic medals based on the efforts by the athletes who competed in the track and field.  Javelin thrower Keshorn Walcott became the first Trinidadian athlete to win an Olympic gold medal since the 1976 Summer Olympics in Montreal, where Hasely Crawford won for the sprint event. Marc Burns, a four-time Olympic athlete and a relay sprinter who led his team by winning the silver medal in Beijing, was the nation's flag bearer at the opening ceremony.

Overview 
Trinidad and Tobago's participation in these Olympic games marked its sixteenth appearance as an independent nation since 1964, although it had previously competed in four Olympic games under two different colonies; one as a British colony in 1948, when the nation marked its debut in the same host city for these games, and the other as part of the West Indies Federation, together with Jamaica and Barbados.

Although the athletes from Trinidad and Tobago had competed at every Olympic games since its debut, the nation's delegation to the London Olympics has become the most successful performance at any other Olympic games. It was the largest at any previous Games, with 30 athletes, competing only in 6 sports (athletics, boxing, cycling, sailing, shooting, and swimming). Trinidad and Tobago had also created its historical record by winning the most Olympic medals in the overall standings (4 medals, surpassing the nation's performance at the 1964 Summer Olympics in Tokyo by less than a single medal).

At the London Games, javelin thrower Keshorn Walcott set the nation's historic Olympic record by winning its first ever gold medal since 1976, and the first medal in the field events. Walcott, at age 19, also became Trinidad and Tobago's youngest ever Olympic champion, and the first non-European athlete to win the men's javelin throw since United States' Cy Young at the 1952 Summer Olympics in Helsinki. Furthermore, he was able to break the national record in the javelin throw event, and to surpass Norway's Andreas Thorkildsen, the defending champion and the Olympic record holder, who finished sixth in the final.

Three other medals were awarded in the track events. Sprinter Lalonde Gordon received the bronze medal in the men's 400 metres. He also led the relay team by winning another medal in the men's 4 × 400 metres relay. Richard Thompson, silver medalist in the men's 100 metres at the Beijing games, and Marc Burns, a four-time Olympic athlete, on the other hand, led their team this time to settle for the silver medal in the men's 4 × 100 metres relay.

Apart from the track and field, Trinidad and Tobago also excelled in cycling and swimming. Njisane Phillip qualified for the men's sprint and Keirin events in track cycling, but narrowly missed the bronze medal to Australia's Shane Perkins, finishing only in fourth place. Meanwhile, swimmer and former Olympic bronze medalist George Bovell had competed in the freestyle and backstroke events, particularly in the men's 50 m freestyle. After his dismal performance in Beijing, Bovell performed tremendously in these Olympic games by finishing first in the overall heats, and fifth in the semi-finals, allowing him to take the qualifying spot for the finals. In the end, he finished abruptly in seventh place.

Medalists

* In May 2014, the US 4 × 100 metres relay team member Tyson Gay received a one-year suspension for anabolic steroid use and was stripped of his medals after 15 July 2012 when he first used. In May 2015, the IOC wrote to US Olympic Committee telling them to collect the medals from teammates Trell Kimmons, Justin Gatlin, Ryan Bailey, Jeffery Demps and Darvis Patton. Two of Gay's teammates who ran with him in the final, Kimmons and Bailey, had previously also served suspensions. The medals were reallocated, with Trinidad and Tobago awarded silver, and France taking bronze.

Athletics

Athletes from Trinidad & Tobago have so far achieved qualifying standards in the following athletics events (up to a maximum of 3 athletes in each event at the 'A' Standard, and 1 at the 'B' Standard):

Men
Track & road events

* Jamol James was selected in the men's 4 × 100 m relay, but did not compete.

Field events

Women
Track & road events

Field events

Boxing

Trinidad and Tobago has qualified boxers for the following events.

Men

Cycling

Track
Sprint

Keirin

Sailing

Trinidad and Tobago has qualified 1 boat for each of the following events

Men

M = Medal race; EL = Eliminated – did not advance into the medal race;

Shooting

Men

Swimming

Swimmers from Trinidad and Tobago have further achieved qualifying standards in the following events (up to a maximum of 2 swimmers in each event at the Olympic Qualifying Time (OQT), and potentially 1 at the Olympic Selection Time (OST)):

Men

See also
Trinidad and Tobago at the 2012 Summer Paralympics
Trinidad and Tobago at the 2011 Pan American Games

References

External links

Nations at the 2012 Summer Olympics
2012
2012 in Trinidad and Tobago sport